Rivers State Television (abbreviated RSTV), UHF channel 22 is a state-owned television station in Port Harcourt city, Rivers State. It began its operation in 1985. Initially, the station's broadcasting power was 1 kW and signals were transmitted on UHF channel 55. After an upgrade in 1991, RSTV moved to UHF Channel 22 and had its radiated power boosted to 30 kW.

Signal transmission and reception
RSTV's signal is received in parts of nine states. Its studios and transmitter are co-located in the Elelenwo neighborhood on the southwest side of Oyigbo.

See also
Radio Rivers 99.1

References

External links

Mass media in Port Harcourt
Television stations in Nigeria
Television channels and stations established in 1985
Companies based in Port Harcourt
Public broadcasting in Rivers State
1985 establishments in Nigeria
1980s establishments in Rivers State
Elelenwo, Port Harcourt